"Clout" is a song by American rapper Offset, featuring his wife and fellow American rapper Cardi B, released as the second single from Offset's debut solo album Father of 4 on March 15, 2019. Although the song initially charted following the album's release, it reached the top 40 of the US Billboard Hot 100 after the release of its music video in April 2019. It received a nomination for Best Rap Performance at the 62nd Grammy Awards, marking Offset's first nomination as a soloist outside of Migos.

Background
The song is a criticism of those who use others for fame, including social climbers or "clout chasers", with the lyrics calling out those who have "the Instagram disease". "Clout" marks Offset and Cardi B's fifth collaboration, following "Um Yea", "Lick (Remix)", "MotorSport" and "Drip".

Critical reception
Writing for AllMusic, Fred Thomas opined that the song "is made by Cardi B's high-energy, high-confrontation cameo." Charles Holmes of Rolling Stone found Cardi's performance "brutal, swift and nimble" and considered it among the best on the album; he noted the song features her "dismantling a variety of unnamed detractors: rappers, blogs, trolls." In NME, Sam Moore opined that Cardi B demonstrates "her show-stopping prowess" in her verse. HotNewHipHop stated that "hip-hop's power couple" delivers "the hardest-hitting banger on the project, blasting the opps while they're at it." In Exclaim!, Kyle Mullin described it as a "swaggering, ominous keys peppered" song, where Cardi B sounds "like the biggest rapper in the world as she nimbly mocks gossipy, nosy haters trolling her in vain." Similarly, Highsnobietys Thomas Hobbs said that her verse delivers "a necessary dose of energy."

In Consequence of Sound, Wren Graves found "explosive potential" in the song, and noticed that in an album lyrically centered on his personal life, Offset "has retreated to platitudes" and "turn their attention to bloggers" instead of giving details about their relationship, further commenting, "perhaps the marriage wasn't in a place where the couple felt comfortable discussing it." Brian Josephs of Entertainment Weekly deemed the song "a gem", "anchored by a Cardi B verse" to "express her indignation," and noted the hook "features a relatable amount of deadpanned disgust;" however, Josephs felt "unfortunate" that "a song about clout chasers is a highlight from an album introducing a family man." Trent Clarck of HipHopDX felt the performers "can absolutely do better."

Music video

The  Daniel Russell-directed music video was announced by Cardi B on April 16 and released on April 17, 2019. Offset and Joseph Desrosiers Jr. served as creative directors. It features Offset and Cardi B delivering their verses in a yellow and black hall of mirrors. Offset plays piano while wearing a couture hockey mask, and then uses a bright-yellow chainsaw to cut a black cake. Cardi B is shown in an all-yellow outfit in a pile of lemons, and also wearing all-black leather bondage outfit giving a lap dance to Offset in another scene. It was inspired by Busta Rhymes' video for "What's It Gonna Be?!" featuring Janet Jackson (1999). In Stereogum, Tom Breihan praised it saying "the whole thing rules" and called it "a really great music video." Vulture called the video "mostly just an excuse for Offset to show off his piano fingers and Cardi to get her freak on in some increasingly elaborate outfits".

Live performances 
Cardi and Offset both performed "Clout" at the 2019 BET Awards, along with a performance of "Press". They also performed "Clout" on Jimmy Kimmel Live! on July 17, 2019.

Awards and nominations

Personnel
Credits adapted from the liner notes of Father of 4.

Personnel

 Offset - primary vocalist, songwriting
 Cardi B - featured artist, songwriting
 Leland Wayne - production, songwriting
 Joshua Luellen - production, songwriting
 Kevin Gomringer - production, songwriting
 Tim Gomringer - production, songwriting
 JRich ENT. - recording
 Evan LeRay - recording
 Thomas "Tillie" Mann - mixing
 DJ Durel - mixing
 Ethan Stevens - mixing

Recording and management
 Recorded at Offset Studios LA (Los Angeles, California)
 Mixed at Mama's House Studios (Atlanta, Georgia)
 Published by YRN Piped Up Ent/JPL QC Music/Reservoir Media Music (ASCAP), Washpoppin/Sony/ATV Allegro (ASCAP), Want Some More/ Songs Of Universal, Inc (BMI), Royal Legend Publishing/Warner-Tamerlane Publishing Corp (BMI), Sony/ATV Music Publishing (BMI), and Songs Of Universal, Inc (BMI)
 Cardi B appears courtesy of KSR/Atlantic Recording Corporation

Charts

Weekly charts

Year-end charts

Certifications

References

2019 singles
2019 songs
Offset (rapper) songs
Cardi B songs
Songs written by Offset (rapper)
Songs written by Cardi B
Songs written by Tim Gomringer
Songs written by Kevin Gomringer
Songs written by Southside (record producer)
Song recordings produced by Southside (record producer)
Capitol Records singles
Motown singles